Hulsoff is a surname. Notable people with the surname include:

Barry Hulshoff (1946–2020), Dutch footballer
Maria Aletta Hulshoff (1781–1846), Dutch patriot, feminist, and pamphleteer

Hulshoff Design Center 
Hulshoff Design Center is a Dutch interior design company that was founded in 1891.